Slipstream are an English indie rock band, not to be confused with the American band "The Slipstream", were formed in 1994 after Mark Refoy left Spiritualized. The band consisted of Ian Anderson on guitar, Gary Lennon on bass, Steve Beswick on drums and occasional appearances from Jonny Mattock who had also stopped drumming for Spiritualized later that year. Over the following five years the band released two albums, Slipstream and Be Groovy Or Leave, and a compilation CD, Side Effects, all on Ché Trading.

In 1999, the band ceased recording after releasing a final single, "Everything And Anything", on the Enraptured label. The track featured on the soundtrack to the BBC Three sitcom, Ideal starring Johnny Vegas.

In 2004, Slipstream now down to a two-piece consisting of the former Spacemen 3 members, Mark Refoy and Jonny Mattock, decided to play live again, with the help of electronic augmentation.  Both men reside in their home town of Northampton.

In January 2008, Slipstream released their new album Mantra as a download at www.northernstarrecords.co.uk. The twelve-track album was mixed by Pete Gleadall at his West London studio, Hoedown City. Mantra was released on CD on the Enraptured label on 27 October 2008. All songs were written by Mark Refoy and Jonny Mattock. The album Stereo Brain Mono Heart, was released in 2013 on the Mind Expansion label in the US.

He appeared alongside former Levitation and Dark Star guitarist Bic Hayes on the world tour for the Pet Shop Boys, including an appearance headlining the Live 8 concert, Moscow.  
 
Refoy and Mattock have also played on the Freelovebabies album by former Spacemen 3/Spiritualized bassist Will Carruthers.

Discography

EPs and singles

Albums

Compilation albums

References

External links
 MySpace site

English indie rock groups
Musical groups established in 1994